Monique Joyce (1912–1994) was a French model, singer and actress. She began her career appearing in Opéra comique. After winning the Mademoiselle Paris contest in March 1933 she received greater public attention and made her first film appearance that year.

During the Occupation of France she appeared in several productions by the German-backed Continental Films that later led to charges of collaboration. Her final role was a supporting part in the 1943 film Late Love directed by Gustav Ucicky and made in Vienna. Following the Liberation of Paris in 1944 she headed to the Sigmaringen enclave where the Vichy government in exile was headquartered for the final months of the war.

Selected filmography
 Ciboulette (1933)
 Criminal (1933)
 The Courier of Lyon (1937)
 Mother Love (1938)
 Nightclub Hostess (1940)
 Twisted Mistress (1942)
 Miss Bonaparte (1942)
 Late Love (1943)

References

Bibliography
 Burch, Noël & Sellier, Geneviève. The Battle of the Sexes in French Cinema, 1930–1956. Duke University Press, 2013.
 Waldman, Harry. Maurice Tourneur: The Life and Films. McFarland, 2001.

External links

1912 births
1994 deaths
French film actresses
20th-century French women singers
Models from Paris
20th-century French actresses
Actresses from Paris